Gime Touré (born 7 May 1994) is a French professional footballer who plays as a winger and striker for Scottish Championship club Cove Rangers.

Career
Touré spent his early career with Brest II, Viry-Châtillon, La Roche, Fontenay, Macclesfield Town, AFC Fylde, Sutton United and Hartlepool United. He spent one season with Hartlepool, where he finished the 2019–20 season as top scorer for them with 13 goals in all competitions.

He left Hartlepool at the end of the 2019–20 season after expressing a desire to play at a higher level. In August 2020 he signed for Carlisle United. Touré scored on his debut against Fleetwood Town in the EFL Trophy, opening the scoring in a 3-1 home defeat, before later being sent off in the game. On 21 October 2021, Toure returned to the National League to join Aldershot Town on loan. On 9 May 2022, it was announced that Touré would be released by Carlisle United at the end of the 2021–22 season.

On 12 August 2022, Touré signed for National League side Yeovil Town. On 9 December 2022, Touré left Yeovil by mutual consent.

On 3 February 2023, Touré joined Scottish Championship club Cove Rangers.

Career statistics

References

1994 births
Living people
French footballers
Black French sportspeople
ESA Linas-Montlhéry players
Stade Brestois 29 players
ES Viry-Châtillon players
La Roche VF players
Vendée Fontenay Foot players
Macclesfield Town F.C. players
AFC Fylde players
Sutton United F.C. players
Hartlepool United F.C. players
Carlisle United F.C. players
Aldershot Town F.C. players
Yeovil Town F.C. players
National League (English football) players
Championnat National 2 players
Championnat National 3 players
English Football League players
Association football wingers
Association football forwards
French expatriate footballers
French expatriate sportspeople in England
Expatriate footballers in England
Expatriate footballers in Scotland
French expatriate sportspeople in Scotland
Cove Rangers F.C. players
Scottish Professional Football League players